Hualapai Airport  is a private-use airport located  northeast of the central business district of Peach Springs, in Coconino County, Arizona, United States.  It is privately owned by the Hualapai Indian Tribe, who also own the public-use Grand Canyon West Airport located 60 miles (97 km) northwest of Peach Springs.

As per Federal Aviation Administration records, the airport had 430 passenger boardings (enplanements) in calendar year 2005 and 917 scheduled enplanements in 2006.

Facilities 
The airport has one asphalt paved runway:
 7/25 which measuring

References

External links 
 
 

Airports in Mohave County, Arizona
Native American airports